The Coatesville team was a minor league baseball team based in Coatesville, Pennsylvania. The "Coatesville" minor league teams played as members of the 1904 Pennsylvania League, 1905 Tri-State League and 1908 Pennsylvania-New Jersey League and were without a known team nickname, common in the era.

History
In 1904, the Coatesville team began minor league play as members of the Independent level Pennsylvania League.

The 1904 Pennsylvania League was a six–team league. Joining Coatesville in the Pennsylvania League were the teams based in Carlisle, Pennsylvania, Chester, Pennsylvania, Johnstown, Pennsylvania (Johnstown Johnnies), Oxford, Pennsylvania and Pottstown, Pennsylvania. While rosters exist, the team records and statistics of the 1904 Pennsylvania League are unknown.

The 1905 Coatesville team continued play as charter members of the Tri-State League, which was an eight–team Independent league. The Coatesville franchise moved to Shamokin, Pennsylvania during the 1905 season. In August, 1905, Coatesville relocated to Shamokin after playing some home games in Reading, Pennsylvania. The 1905 Coatesville/Shamokin team finished with a 56–69 record to place 5th in the Tri-State League standings. The team was managed by Percy Stetler and finished 12.5 games behind the 1st place Williamsport Millionaires in the final standings. The Coatesville/Shamokin and the Lebanon Dutch Peaches teams did not return to play in 1906, as the Tri–State League reduced to six teams.

The 1908 Coatesville team returned to play as the team became members of the Independent level Pennsylvania-New Jersey League. The 1908 Pennsylvania–New Jersey League played as a six–team Independent league. The Coatesville team was joined in the Pennsylvania–New Jersey League by franchises based in Allentown, Pennsylvania, Chester, Pennsylvania, Newark, New Jersey, Trenton, New Jersey and York, Pennsylvania.

Beginning play on April 30, 1908, Coatesville finished 4th in the Pennsylvania-New Jersey League final standings. In the final standings, Chester (8–3–1) and Trenton Tigers (7–2–1) ended in a tie for 1st place, with Trenton having a higher win percentage. Allentown (6–3–2), Coatesville (5–6–2), York (5–7–0) and Newark (0–10–0) followed in the standings.

The Pennsylvania-New Jersey League permanently folded after the 1908 season. Coatesville, Pennsylvania has not hosted another minor league team.

The ballpark
The name of the Coatesville home minor league ballpark is not referenced.

Timeline

Year–by–year records

Notable alumni

Harry Arndt (1905)
Chub Aubrey (1905)
John Brackenridge (1905)
Herbert Jackson (1905)
Swat McCabe (1905)
Doc Reisling (1905)
Bud Sharpe (1905)
Shag Shaughnessy (1905)
Jack Slattery (1905)
Joe Ward (1905)
Dave Williams (1905)
Eddie Zimmerman (1905)

See also
Coatesville/Shamokin players

References

External links
Baseball Reference

Defunct baseball teams in Pennsylvania
Baseball teams established in 1904
Baseball teams disestablished in 1908
Coatesville, Pennsylvania
Pennsylvania League teams
Pennsylvania-New Jersey League teams